The 1972–73 Ice hockey Bundesliga season was the 15th season of the Ice hockey Bundesliga, the top level of ice hockey in Germany. 11 teams participated in the league, and EV Fussen won the championship.

Regular season

References

External links
Season on hockeyarchives.info

Eishockey-Bundesliga seasons
German
Bund